is a boulevard that marks the border between the 1st and the 4th arrondissements of Lyon, in the neighborhood Croix-Rousse.

Location 
The boulevard runs east–west and is the border between the 1st and 4th arrondissements and the neighborhoods  and Plateau de la Croix-Rousse.

History 
The Croix-Rousse ramparts were reconstructed in 1834 on the remains of 16th century ramparts, which had been demolished during the revolt of Lyon against the National Convention in 1793. In 1852 when Croix-Rousse became a quarter of Lyon the ramparts were destroyed to facilitate the integration of the new quarter.  was constructed on the former site of these fortifications in 1865. A town hall was built and trees were planted along the boulevard at this time.

The Croix-Rousse Market and the Vogue fair (formerly the Parish Festival of the church of Saint-Denis) began to take place on the boulevard soon after its construction.

From 1863 to 1914, the boulevard functioned as a single-lane road that served the Lyon-Croix-Rousse station next to the upper station of the Rue Terme funicular.

Monuments 
 Collège de la Tourette, which was inaugurated 30September 1879 by Jules Ferry, is located on the boulevard.
 , one of the largest boules playing surfaces in Lyon and among the oldest in France, is located along the boulevard.
 Gros Caillou (large rock), is one of the symbols of the neighborhood.

Events 
 The  (Croix-Rousse Market) extends for about 1km along the boulevard every week from Tuesday to Sunday.
 The  fair takes place along the boulevard every autumn. 

Accessibility 
The street is serviced by metro station Croix-Rousse. There is a Vélo'v station at the metro entrance.

See also 

 List of streets and squares in Lyon

References

External links 

 Official website of the city council of the 1st arrondissement of Lyon 
 Official website of the city council of the 4th arrondissement of Lyon 
 Official website of the Croix Rousse Market 
 Official website for the Croix-Rousse neighborhood 
 Official website for the Pentes de la Croix-Rousse neighborhood 

1st arrondissement of Lyon
4th arrondissement of Lyon
Streets in Lyon
1865 establishments in France